Nelidovo is a rural locality (a village) in Vorobyovskoye Rural Settlement, Sokolsky District, Vologda Oblast, Russia. The population was 14 as of 2002.

Geography 
Nelidovo is located 71 km northeast of Sokol (the district's administrative centre) by road. Kopylovo is the nearest rural locality.

References 

Rural localities in Sokolsky District, Vologda Oblast